Susanne Brink's Arirang is a 1991 South Korean/Swedish film based upon the life and experiences of Susanne Brink, an adult Korean adoptee from Sweden who suffered abuse and racism in her adoptive home and country. The real Susanne Brink died of cancer in January 2009 at the age of 45; she was interred in her hometown of Norrköping.

Cast 
 Choi Jin-sil ... Susanne 
 Åsa Älmeby ... Nurse 
 Kim Yun-kyeong 
 Malin Berghagen ... Ulrika 
 Pierre Boutros ... Christer 
 Lars Green ... Rune 
 Pia Green ... Inger 
 Jeon Suk
 Helena Lindblom
 Park Yong-soo
 Niclas Wahlgren ... Willy
 Mona Seilitz....Birgitta
 Kim Ji-young

References 

 Hübinette, Tobias. "The Nation is a Woman: The Korean Nation Embodied as an Overseas Adopted Korean Woman in Chang Kil-su's Susanne Brink's Arirang". Intersections: Gender, History and Culture in the Asian Context, Issue 11, August 2005. Retrieved on 6 December 2008.
 Hübinette, Tobias. "The suffering and shaming of Korea". Comforting an Orphaned Nation, pp. 126–143. Retrieved on 6 December 2008.
 Hübinette, Tobias. "Susanne Brink's Arirang". The adopted Koreans of Sweden and the Korean adoption issue, pp. 9–11. Retrieved on 6 December 2008.
 Hübinette, Tobias. "Representing Adopted Korean Women in Korean Feature Films". Nationalism, Subalternity, and the Adopted Koreans, pp. 118–119. Retrieved on 6 December 2008.

External links 
 
 

1991 films
1990s Korean-language films
South Korean drama films
1990s Swedish-language films
Films about adoption
1991 multilingual films
Swedish multilingual films
South Korean multilingual films
Swedish drama films
1990s Swedish films